Gangotri is a town and a Nagar Panchayat (municipality) in Uttarkashi district in the state of Uttarakhand, India. It is 99 km from Uttarkashi, the main district headquarter. It is a Hindu pilgrim town on the banks of the river Bhagirathi – the origin of the river Ganges. According to popular Hindu legend, Goddess Ganga descended here when Lord Shiva released the mighty river from the locks of his hair.

Gangotri significance 

Gangotri is one of the four sites in the Chota Char Dham pilgrimage circuit. It is also the origin of the Ganges river and seat of the goddess Ganga. The river is called Bhagirathi at the source and acquires the name Ganga (the Ganges) from Devprayag onwards where it meets the Alaknanda. The origin of the holy river is at Gaumukh, set in the Gangotri Glacier, and is a 19 km trek from Gangotri. The original Gangotri Temple was built by the Nepalese general Amar Singh Thapa. The temple is closed from Diwali day every year and is reopened on Akshaya Tritiya. During this time, the idol of the goddess is kept at Mukhba village, near Harsil. Ritual duties of the temple are supervised by the Semwal family of pujaris. These pujaris hail from Mukhba village.

Gangotri Temple
A temple dedicated to Goddess Ganga is located near a sacred stone where King Bhagiratha worshipped Lord Shiva. According to Hindu culture, Goddess Ganga took the form of a river to absolve the sins of King Bhagiratha's predecessors, following his severe penance of several centuries. Bhagiratha Shila is a sacred slab where king Bhagiratha meditated. Ganga is believed to have touched earth at this spot. According to another legend, Pandavas performed the great ‘Deva Yagna‘ here to atone the deaths of their kinsmen in the epic battle of Mahabharata. Hindus believe that performing the ancestral rites on the banks of Bhagirathi frees the spirit of the ancestor from the cycle of rebirth and a holy dip in its waters cleanses sins committed in the present also past births.

The Gangotri temple opens on the auspicious day of Akshaya Tritiya which falls in the month of May and closes on Yama Dwitiya or Bhai Dooj which falls in the month of November. The Gangotri temple remains closed for the rest of six months. The Goddess shifts to the village Mukhba during the winter months. In the month of May, Ganga Dussehra is celebrated with great fanfare as the day of the birth of Ganga.

Demographics
According to the 2011 census of India, there are total 47 families residing in Gangotri. The total population of Gangotri is 110 out of which 97 are males and 13 are females. The literacy rate of Gangotri is 99.1%. The entire population of Gangotri identifies as Hindu.

See also
 Gangotri National Park
 Harsil
 Yamuna
 Akshaya Tritiya
 Mukhba

References

External Links

Articles containing potentially dated statements from 2001
All articles containing potentially dated statements
Cities and towns in Uttarkashi district
Hindu pilgrimage sites in India
Hindu temples in Uttarakhand
Chota Char Dham temples
Tourism in Uttarakhand
Hindu holy cities
Ganges